Sagger may mean:

 AT-3 Sagger, NATO reporting name of  9M14 Malyutka, a Soviet anti-tank missile
 Sagger, a misspelling of saggar, a protective casing of fire clay in which delicate ceramic articles are fired
 Sagger, someone who wears his pants very low, revealing an undergarment or buttocks, see sagging (fashion)